Kenneth Gary Albert (born February 2, 1968) is an American sportscaster, the son of NBA sportscaster Marv Albert and nephew of sportscasters Al Albert and Steve Albert. He is the only sportscaster who currently does play-by-play for all four major professional sports leagues in the United States and Canada (NFL, NBA, MLB, NHL).

Early life
Albert's parents gave him a tape recorder for his fifth birthday to practice his broadcasting. On his sixth birthday in 1974, his father took him along to a New York Rangers game. One of the statisticians had to leave in the middle of the game, so Albert got to do the stats for the rest of the game. At 14, he became the official statistician for the Rangers on the radio. At 16, he wrote content for the Rangers program. Aside from his father, his idol was Vancouver Canucks play-by-play broadcaster Jim Robson. From 1981 to 1986, Albert, growing up in Sands Point, covered high school sports for the Port Washington News at Paul D. Schreiber High School, an Anton Community Newspapers publication.

Albert graduated from New York University in 1990 with a degree in broadcasting and journalism. He was a member of the Sigma Phi Epsilon fraternity. Albert worked in the sports department at WNYU radio. While working there he was able to pick up his quick responses while announcing local games.

Broadcasting career
Albert is the radio voice of the New York Rangers, as well as a play-by-play announcer and field-level reporter for Fox's coverage of Major League Baseball, the National Football League, and previously, the Sugar Bowl. Previously, he handled TV play-by-play for the Washington Capitals and Washington Bullets (now the Washington Wizards), and was a part-time announcer on Washington Nationals telecasts in 2005. Additionally, he does TV play-by-play for the Washington Commanders (formerly the Washington Redskins) preseason games with Joe Theismann. Albert called the international broadcast of Super Bowl XLVI with Theismann.

When Fox had the network contract for the National Hockey League in the 1990s, Albert also worked on Fox NHL Saturday telecasts. Albert previously did play-by-play for the NHL on NBC and formerly with Versus (now called NBCSN). Albert called Game 1 of the 2014 Stanley Cup Finals for NBC, filling in for Mike Emrick, who was dealing with a death in the family. He has done work for NBC's Olympics coverage, as a play-by-play announcer for men's and women's ice hockey at every Winter Olympic Games since Salt Lake City in 2002.

Albert has also done college basketball for ESPN Plus and is a substitute play-by-play announcer for televised New York Knicks games on MSG Network. For the 2011 playoffs, Albert broadcast for two playoff teams in the same market, doing the play-by-play for the New York Rangers on WEPN 1050 ESPN radio and filling in on MSG Network doing play-by-play for the New York Knicks.

Albert was the play-by-play announcer for the 2015 American League Division Series between the Texas Rangers and the Toronto Blue Jays. In the top of the 7th inning of Game 5, he helped explain the rule regarding the errant throw by Toronto Blue Jays catcher Russell Martin, which resulted in Texas scoring the go-ahead run. In the bottom of the inning, he called Jose Bautista's go-ahead home run.

In 2016, Albert was nominated for the Sports Emmy Award for Outstanding Sports Personality, Play-by-Play in a list that included fellow Fox and NBC colleagues Kevin Burkhardt, eventual winner Mike Emrick, and even his own father.

After Emrick's retirement, Albert became NBC's lead play-by-play announcer beginning in the  2020–21 NHL season, paired with Emrick's long-time partner Eddie Olczyk. Albert previously filled in for Emrick in game one of the 2014 Stanley Cup Finals due to a death in the latter’s family. With NBC losing its NHL rights after the 2021–22 season, the pair moved to Turner Sports to serve in the same capacity.

Albert is a frequent guest on WNYU-FM's sports talk program, The Cheap Seats. He has also made many appearances on the popular New York sports internet radio show Sports Heaven with Mark and Evan.

Four sports in four days
On October 25, 2009, Albert called the play-by-play of the Minnesota Vikings – Pittsburgh Steelers NFL game for Fox and then hosted the New York Yankees' locker room celebration after clinching the American League Championship Series that night. The following night he broadcast a Rangers game on radio and on October 28, he called the play-by-play of the New York Knicks season opener on MSG Network.

Personal life
Albert currently resides in New Jersey with his wife of 20 years, Barbara (Wolf), and their two daughters, Amanda and Sydney. Albert was introduced to his wife by close friend and Baltimore sports reporter, Jerry Coleman.
 
Albert has frequently cited his love of all sports, but mainly hockey and basketball.  He has cited baseball as the hardest sport to commentate for.

Career timeline
1990–1992: Baltimore Skipjacks – play-by-play
1992–1995: Washington Capitals – play-by-play on NBC Sports Washington
1993–1994: NHL on ESPN2 – play-by-play
1994–1995, 2016–present: NHL Radio – lead play-by-play
1994–present: NFL on Fox – play-by-play 
1995–1999: NHL on Fox – play-by-play
1995–present: New York Rangers – radio play-by-play
1999–2000: NTRA on Fox – host
2001–2019, 2022–present: Major League Baseball on Fox – play-by-play
2002: Winter Olympics – hockey play-by-play
2005: Washington Nationals – fill-in television play-by-play
2005–2006: NHL on Versus – play-by-play
2006: Winter Olympics – hockey play-by-play
2007–2009: Sugar Bowl – play-by-play
2009–present: New York Knicks – fill-in television play-by-play
2010: Winter Olympics – hockey play-by-play
2010–present: Washington Commanders Broadcast Network – preseason play-by-play
2011: NHL on Versus – playoffs play-by-play
2012–2021: NHL on NBC – secondary play-by-play and then lead play-by-play
2014: Winter Olympics – hockey play-by-play
2016: Summer Olympics – track and field play-by-play
2018: Winter Olympics – hockey play-by-play
2021: Summer Olympics - baseball and volleyball play-by-play
2021–present: NHL on TNT - Lead play-by-play
2022: Winter Olympics - hockey play-by-play

Broadcasting partners
Troy Aikman
Rod Allen
Brian Baldinger
Ronde Barber 
Brian Boucher
Terry Bradshaw
Sean Casey
Rick Cerone
Brian Engblom
Cliff Floyd
Walt Frazier
Joe Girardi
Mark Grace
Tim Green
Tim Hutchings
Daryl Johnston
Keith Jones
Eric Karros
Howie Long
Steve Lyons
Dave Maloney
Tim McCarver
Pierre McGuire
Joe Micheletti
Mike Milbury
A. J. Mleczko
Anthony Muñoz
Chris Myers
CJ Nitkowski
Eddie Olczyk
Darren Pang
A. J. Pierzynski
Lou Pinella
Ron Pitts
Harold Reynolds
Ken Rosenthal
Bryce Salvador
Tony Siragusa
Kendall Coyne Schofield
Joe Theismann
Jeff Torborg
Tom Verducci
Jonathan Vilma

References

1968 births
Living people
American Hockey League broadcasters
American horse racing announcers
American radio sports announcers
American television sports announcers
College basketball announcers in the United States
College football announcers
High school basketball announcers in the United States
Major League Baseball broadcasters
National Basketball Association broadcasters
National Football League announcers
National Hockey League broadcasters
New York Knicks announcers
New York Rangers announcers
New York University alumni
Olympic Games broadcasters
Washington Bullets announcers
Washington Capitals announcers
Washington Nationals announcers
Women's National Basketball Association announcers
Paul D. Schreiber Senior High School alumni
Jewish American sportspeople
21st-century American Jews